Trap is a 2019 South Korean television series starring Lee Seo-jin, Sung Dong-il and Lim Hwa-young. It is OCN's first series for their new project called "Dramatic Cinema" that combines film and drama formats. It aired from February 9 to March 3, 2019.

Synopsis
The story of a man who goes to a trip with his family and encounters life-changing event and falls into a mysterious trap.

Cast

Main
 Lee Seo-jin as Kang Woo-hyun, a successful anchorman who is beloved by the nation and seems to have a perfect life. He suddenly experiences a tragedy while vacationing with his family.
 Sung Dong-il as Go Dong-kook, a veteran detective with uncanny instincts who is assigned to Woo-hyun's case.
 Lim Hwa-young as Yoon Seo-young, a well-known and intelligent profiler who analyzes cases and provides the criminal's profile. She cooperates with Dong-kook on investigation.

Supporting

People around Kang Woo-hyun
 Seo Young-hee as Shin Yeon-soo, Woo-hyun's wife.
 Oh Ryung as Representative Hong
 Lee Joo-bin as Kim Si-hyun
 Oh Han-kyul as Kang Si-woo

People around Go Dong-kook
 Kim Kwang-kyu as Squad Chief Jang
 Jo Dal-hwan as Bae Nam-soo
 Jang Sung-bum as Park Seong-bum
 Lee Eun-woo as Park Sun-mi
 Choi Myung-bin as Go Min-joo
 Seo Eun-sol as young Go Min-joo

Others
 Yoon Kyung-ho as Master Yun
 Sung Hyuk as Hunter
 Byun Hee-bong as Kim Shin-woo
 Kwak Min-ho as Gwang Su-dae
 Jang Won-hyung as Ho-gae
 Lee Hong-nae
 Dong Hyun-bae as Reporter Seo
 Baek Ji-won as Ms. Jo
 Kwon Hyuk-beom as Ms. Jo's staff
 Oh Chang-kyung as Yang Deok-cheol
 Lee Si-hun as Lee Si-hun 
 Choi Jae-seop as Reporter Ko

Viewership

Notes

References

External links
  
 
 

OCN television dramas
Korean-language television shows
2019 South Korean television series debuts
2019 South Korean television series endings
South Korean thriller television series